Macrocheilus burgeoni is a species of ground beetle in the subfamily Anthiinae. It was described by Basilewsky in 1967.

References

Anthiinae (beetle)
Beetles described in 1967